The DRG Class E93 is an electric heavy freight locomotive built by AEG for Deutsche Reichsbahn in 1933. Its development was triggered by the electrification of the Geislinger Steige, a steep grade of the mainline railroad between Stuttgart and Ulm, which had been electrified in 1933 and required powerful new freight locomotives to overcome it with heavy freight trains.

Production
The 18 ordered units were delivered between 1933 and 1937.

Appearance
The external appearance superficially resembles a Swiss crocodile but the German locomotive differs in that the axles are individually powered and the body is not articulated.

Electric locomotives of Germany
15 kV AC locomotives
E93
Co′Co′ locomotives
AEG locomotives
Brown, Boveri & Cie locomotives
Railway locomotives introduced in 1933
Standard gauge locomotives of Germany

Freight locomotives
Co′Co′ electric locomotives of Europe